In geometry, a truncated cubic prism is a convex uniform polychoron (four-dimensional polytope).

It is one of 18 convex uniform polyhedral prisms created by using uniform prisms to connect pairs of Platonic solids or Archimedean solids in parallel hyperplanes.

Net

Alternative names 
 Truncated-cubic hyperprism 
 Truncated-cubic dyadic prism (Norman W. Johnson) 
 Ticcup (Jonathan Bowers: for truncated-cube prism)

See also
Truncated tesseract,

External links 
 
 

4-polytopes
Truncated tilings